The Pakistan Mazdoor Kissan Party (PMKP) was a political party in Pakistan founded in 1974 by Afzal Khamosh. On 20 December 2015, it merged with the Communist Mazdoor Kissan Party, forming the current Mazdoor Kisan Party.

See also 
Communist Mazdoor Kissan Party

References

External links
Official website

1974 establishments in Pakistan
2015 disestablishments in Pakistan
Agrarian parties in Pakistan
Defunct agrarian political parties
Defunct political parties in Pakistan
Defunct socialist parties in Asia
Political parties disestablished in 2015
Political parties established in 1974
Socialist parties in Pakistan